Birinci Ərəbcəbirli (also, Arabdzhabirli Pervoye and Arab-Dzhabirly Pervoye) is a village in the Goychay Rayon of Azerbaijan. The village forms part of the municipality of Ərəbcəbirli.

References 

Parliament of Azerbaijan

Populated places in Goychay District